The Stig Dagerman Prize is a Swedish award given since 1996 by the Stig Dagerman Society and Älvkarleby municipality. It is named in honor of Swedish author Stig Dagerman. The award is given to a person who, or an organization that, in the spirit of Stig Dagerman, supports the significance and availability of the "free word" (freedom of speech), promoting inter-cultural understanding and empathy. It was inspired by Dagerman's poem En dag om året that sets forth a vision of peace for humanity by imagining one day each year when the world is free from violence.

The award ceremony takes place the first weekend in June each year at Laxön in Älvkarleby. On two occasions, 2004 and 2008, the prize winner subsequently won the Nobel Prize in Literature in the same year.

Laureates

1996 – John Hron (posthumously)
1997 – Yasar Kemal 
1998 – The Swedish Public Library 
1999 – Ahmad Shamloo 
2000 – Roy Andersson 
2001 – Elsie Johansson 
2002 – Gitta Sereny 
2003 – Lukas Moodysson 
2004 – Elfriede Jelinek 
2005 – Göran Palm
2006 – Sigrid Kahle
2007 – Lasse Berg
2008 – J. M. G. Le Clézio
2009 – Birgitta Wallin and magazine Karavan
2010 – Eduardo Galeano
2011 – Judit Benedek and the theatre project SOS-Romer
2012 – Nawal El Saadawi
2013 – No one is illegal
2014 – 
2015 – Suzanne Osten
2016 – Adonis
2017 – Anders Kompass
2018 – Amos Oz
2019 – Britta Marakatt-Labba
2020 – Magda Gad
2021 – no award
2022 – Maria Kalesnikava

References

External links
 

1996 establishments in Sweden
Awards established in 1996
Swedish awards
Swedish literary awards